The 1982 United States Senate election in Wisconsin was held on November 2, 1982. Incumbent Democrat William Proxmire defeated Republican nominee Scott McCallum in a landslide, taking 63.65% of the vote to McCallum's 34.14%.

Primary elections
Primary elections were held on September 14, 1982.

Democratic primary

Candidates
William Proxmire, incumbent United States Senator
Marcel Dandeneau, former State Representative

Results

Republican primary

Candidates
Scott McCallum, State Representative
Paul T. Brewer

Results

General election

Candidates
Major party candidates
William Proxmire, Democratic
Scott McCallum, Republican

Other candidates
William O. Hart, Independent
George Liljenfeldt, Libertarian
Sanford G. Knapp, Independent

Results

See also
1982 United States Senate elections

References

1982
Wisconsin
United States Senate